Büşra Ahlatçı (born  	January 23, 1994) is a Turkish women's football midfielder. She last played for Istanbul Defne Spor with jersey number 30 in the 2018-19 Turkish Women's Third League. She was a member of the Turkey girls' national U-19 and Turkey women's teams.

Career
Born in Kadıköy, Istanbul on January 23, 1994, Büşra Ahlatcı began playing football in her early years with the support of her father.

Club
She obtained her license on November 1, 2007. In the 2008–09 season, she joined the high school team Ümraniye Mevlana Lisesi Spor, which competed in the Women's Second League. Already the next season, she found a place in the Ataşehir Belediyespor squad playing in the First League.

Ahlatcı enjoyed two league championship titles with her club in two consecutive seasons, in 2010–11 and 2011–12. She debuted in the UEFA Women's Champions League playing in qualification round match against Gintra-Universitetas from Lithuania on August 11, 2011. She took part in two following matches of her club at the 2011–12 UEFA Women's Champions League – Group 4 round. She participated also at two of the three matches of the 2012–13 UEFA Women's Champions League – Group 1 round.

On February 5, 2016, she signed with 76 Iğdır Spor, which play in the Group 8 (Eastern Anatolia) of the Third League. Her team finished the 2015–16 season as runner-up. However, they failed to advance to the higher league losing the play-off match. In the 2016–17 season, she returned to her former club Ataşehir Belediyespor. However, she transferred to Adana İdmanyurduspor in the second half of the season.

She played in the 2018-19 Turkish Women's Third League for Istanbul Defne Spor.

International
Ahlatcı was admitted to the Turkey women's U-19 national team in 2011. She played her first match against Ukrainian juniors at the Kuban Spring Tournament on March 6, 2011. She capped 12 times for the U-19 nationals.

She was called up to the Turkey women's national team, and debuted in the UEFA Women's Euro 2013 qualifying – Group 2 match against the Swiss team on September 15, 2012. She took part in only two games of the tournament's ten matches of her country. She capped twice so far for the Turkey national team.

Career statistics
.

Honours

Club
 Turkey Women's First League
 Ataşehir Belediyespor
 Winners (2): 2010–11, 2011–12
 Runners-up (2): 2012–13, 2013–14

 Turkey Women's Third League
 76 Iğdır Spor
 Runners-up (1): 2015–16

References

External links
 

Living people
1994 births
People from Kadıköy
Footballers from Istanbul
Turkish women's footballers
Women's association football midfielders
Turkey women's international footballers
Ataşehir Belediyespor players
Adana İdmanyurduspor players
21st-century Turkish sportswomen